The 2015 Men's EuroHockey Championship was the 15th edition of the men's EuroHockey Nations Championship, the biennial international men's field hockey championship of Europe organised by the European Hockey Federation. It was held from 21–29 August 2015 in the Queen Elizabeth Olympic Park, London, England.

The Netherlands defeated the defending champions Germany 6–1 in the final to capture their fourth title, while Ireland won their first-ever medal by beating the hosts England 4–2. As the winners, the Netherlands qualified for the 2016 Summer Olympics in Rio de Janeiro, Brazil.

Qualified teams

Format
The eight teams were split into two groups of four teams. The top two teams advanced to the semi-finals to determine the winner in a knockout system. The bottom two teams played in a new group with the teams they did not play against in the group stage. The last two teams were relegated to the EuroHockey Championship II.

Results

Preliminary round

Pool A

Pool B

Fifth to eighth place classification

Pool C
The points obtained in the preliminary round against the other team are taken over.

First to fourth place classification

Semi-finals

Third and fourth place

Final

Statistics

Final standings

 Qualified for the 2016 Summer Olympics

 Relegated to the EuroHockey Championship II

Awards

Goalscorers

See also
2015 Women's EuroHockey Nations Championship

References

External links

 
Men's EuroHockey Nations Championship
Men 1
Men's EuroHockey Nations Championship
Men's EuroHockey Nations Championship
International sports competitions in London
International field hockey competitions hosted by England
EuroHockey Nations Championship
Field hockey at the Summer Olympics – Men's European qualification
EuroHockey Championship Men
Field hockey in London